Downtown Pasadena California is the central business district of Pasadena, California. It is centered on Fair Oaks Avenue and Colorado Boulevard and is divided into three distinct neighborhoods: Old Pasadena, the Civic Center, and Monk Hill. Downtown Pasadena is known for its historical buildings that have been preserved throughout the years.

History

Early years 
In 1874, Pasadena was founded as an agricultural cooperative for orange growers and was incorporated in 1886 with its commercial center on the intersection of Fair Oaks Avenue and Colorado Boulevard. This intersection has been the center of Downtown Pasadena since then to the present. As Pasadena's population grew in the 1900s, grand hotels were built which established Pasadena's national reputation as a winter tourist destination for the wealthy. As tourism began to grow, there was an increase in money and population that allowed the city to continue its growth.

Downtown's Golden Age 
During the 1900s to the 1940s, Downtown Pasadena went through rapid change as the city's population was continuously growing. Despite The Depression that occurred in the 1930s, Downtown Pasadena continued developing. Its hotels were converted into industrial, manufacturing and research offices. The transition of Downtown Pasadena from a tourist destination to an industrial site allowed for the area to continue its expansion and growth.

Decline and redevelopment 
As business started to move out of Downtown Pasadena in the 1950s, the area started to go through a period of decline. This area began to be known as Skid Row as buildings were left abandoned.

Redevelopment of the downtown area started as there was an infusion of about more than $400 million in public and private money. With the infusion in money, it allowed for private property developments, street improvements, and construction of new buildings such as more parking garages and a retail shopping center. However, not all of this money was focused on new buildings as existing structures were rehabilitated. The existing buildings were redeveloped in order to recreate old Downtown Pasadena.

As the redevelopment plans were completed, Downtown Pasadena went through a period of continuous growth. According to Shigley, Pasadena became a model of smart growth for California. This was because of the mixed-use buildings with housing units, retail shops, and professional services which allowed for the growth of Downtown Pasadena commercially and residentially.

Landmarks

Old Pasadena
Old Pasadena is the historic core of Downtown, and has a multitude of fine shops and restaurants (Italian and Japanese restaurants are especially numerous here). The attractions that are present around this area that involves shopping, dining, and entertainment. There are two parks, the historic Del Mar Station and Castle Green, and the headquarters of Parsons.

Civic Center
The Civic Center lies to the east of Old Pasadena and was built in the 1920s. It is home to Pasadena's City Hall, Paseo Colorado, the Pasadena Civic Auditorium. These buildings are known as historical landmarks. It also houses several municipal government offices, though notably not the Department of Public Works, which is in Banbury Oaks.

Monk Hill
Monk Hill is the westernmost part of Downtown and is home to the Norton Simon Museum and Ambassador Auditorium.

Preservation efforts 
As Downtown Pasadena was going through a time of decline during the 1970s, the city had established a Central District Improvement Plan which to improve the conditions of the area. The plan involved the demolition of old historical buildings in order to make way for more modern buildings.

However, there was a preservationist group called Pasadena Heritage that fought to save and redevelop the existing historic structures. Pasadena Heritage was founded in 1977 to save Civic Center buildings that were facing demolition. Throughout the years, Pasadena Heritage has worked to save numerous historical structures around Downtown Pasadena. Some structures that have been saved from demolition by the members of Pasadena Heritage is the Colorado Street Bridge and Pasadena Playhouse.

Education
Downtown Pasadena is served by Roosevelt, San Rafael, and McKinley Elementary Schools; Blair, and McKinley Middle Schools;, and Blair International Baccalaureate School;
Maranatha High School is a Christian school in the area.

Transportation

Mass transit
The Metro Gold Line has two stations Downtown, at Memorial Park and Del Mar Station. Downtown is also served by Metro Rapid lines 762 and 780; and Metro Local lines 177, 180, 181, 256, 260, 267, 686, and 687; as well as Pasadena ARTS routes 10, 20, 31, 32, 40, 51, 52, and 70; and Foothill Transit line 187.

Major streets
Arroyo Parkway
Colorado Boulevard
Fair Oaks Avenue
Holly Street
Orange Grove Boulevard
Pasadena Avenue

Highways
U.S. Highway 66
Interstate 210
California State Route 110
California State Route 134
California State Route 710

References 

Neighborhoods in Pasadena, California
1886 establishments in California